Ahan Wickramasinghe (born 6 September 2001) is a Sri Lankan cricketer. He made his List A debut on 3 November 2021, for Nondescripts Cricket Club in the 2021–22 Major Clubs Limited Over Tournament. Prior to his List A debut, he was named in Sri Lanka's squad for the 2020 Under-19 Cricket World Cup. He made his Twenty20 debut on 23 May 2022, for Nondescripts Cricket Club in the Major Clubs T20 Tournament.

References

External links
 

2001 births
Living people
Sri Lankan cricketers
Nondescripts Cricket Club cricketers
Place of birth missing (living people)